This was the first edition of the tournament.

Anna Danilina and Ekaterine Gorgodze won the title, defeating Rebecca Marino and Yuki Naito in the final, 7–5, 6–3.

Seeds

Draw

Draw

References
Main Draw

ITF Women's World Tennis Tour – Bellinzona - Doubles